Sesham is a 2002 Indian Malayalam-language drama film written and directed by T. K. Rajeev Kumar, starring Jayaram, Geethu Mohandas, Biju Menon and P. Balachandran. The film zooms into a lunatic asylum and probes the tenuous realms that separate the sane from the insane. Jayaram's portrayal of the character Lonappan is regarded as the best in his career.

The film received critical acclaim, it won four Kerala State Film Awards, including Best Film, Best Story, Best Editor, and Best Sound Recordist.

Plot
Lonappan, the protagonist, is a complacent inmate of a lunatic asylum, whose life becomes the subject of the graduation film of a movie-school student. As the social activist in her dominates the film-maker, she, with the help of her sub-collector fiancé, gets Lonappan released from the asylum and tries to find him a normal life. The story takes a serious turn as Lonappan becomes an integral part of Meera's life and she finds whole things upside down because of his presence at home. She gives him a job in a school. But Lonappan turns out to be a misfit in society. In the meantime, Lonappan gets closer to a child in the school. But he finally decides to go back to the mental asylum and live the rest of life with the inmates. He discards all the facilities offered by Meera. The film ends when her movie titled Timepiece bags award for the best film at the Cannes Film Festival.

Cast
 Jayaram as Lonappan
 Geethu Mohandas as Meera
 Biju Menon
 P. Balachandran
 Mithun Ramesh as Nithin
 P. Sreekumar

Awards
Kerala State Film Awards
Best Film – Latha Kurien Rajeev, K. Madhavan, T. K. Rajeev Kumar
Best Story - T. K. Rajeev Kumar
Best Editor – A. Sreekar Prasad
Best Sound Recordist – Simon Selvaraj

References

External links
 
 Film Review at The Hindu

2000s Malayalam-language films
Films scored by Sharreth
2002 drama films
2002 films
Films about mental health
Indian drama films
Films directed by T. K. Rajeev Kumar